Arteaga Municipality may refer to one of two municipalities in Mexico:

Arteaga Municipality, Michoacán
Arteaga Municipality, Coahuila

Municipality name disambiguation pages